Anne Chamber (married name Anna Grenville-Temple, Countess Temple) (died 7 April 1777) was an English noblewoman and poet.

Life
Chamber and her elder sister Mary were co-heiresses to their late parents' estate. On 7 May 1737, Chamber married Richard Grenville-Temple, 2nd Earl Temple. In 1742, their only child, Elizabeth, died at age four. The couple reportedly had a large income. Anne's dowry was reportedly £50,000, and Richard was erroneously referred to as the richest man in England.

Chamber is known for her poetry, which she took up as an adult. Horace Walpole's company published 100 of her poems in 1764 under the name "Poems" by "Anna Chamber".

Chamber died in Stowe in Buckinghamshire in 1777 just after her 40th wedding anniversary.

In 1818, the verses she had sent to Lady Charles Spencer were published.

References

1709 births
Year of birth uncertain
1777 deaths
18th-century British poets
British women poets
18th-century British women writers
Temple